Cucunubá is a municipality and town of Colombia in the Ubaté Province, part of the department of Cundinamarca. It borders with the municipalities of Ubaté, Lenguazaque, Suesca, Chocontá, Tausa and Sutatausa.

Geography 

Etymology 
The name Cucunubá comes from Chibcha and means "Similarity to a face".

History 
Cucunubá in the times before the Spanish conquest was part of the Muisca Confederation, a loose confederation of rulers of the Muisca.

Modern Cucunubá was founded on August 2, 1600, by Luis Enríquez.

Economy 
Main economical activity of Cucunubá is carbon mining. More than half of the municipality's area is covered with farmfields and livestock farming producers. Main agricultural products are potatoes, peas and wheat.

Gallery

References 

Municipalities of Cundinamarca Department
Populated places established in 1600
1600 establishments in the Spanish Empire
Muisca Confederation
Muysccubun